Dolomena labiosa, common name : the thick-lipped conch,  is a species of sea snail, a marine gastropod mollusk in the family Strombidae, the true conchs.

Description
The shell size varies between 20 mm and 65 mm.

Distribution
This species is distributed in the Indian Ocean along Madagascar and Tanzania; in the Pacific Ocean along the Fiji Islands.

References

 Dautzenberg, Ph. (1929). Mollusques testacés marins de Madagascar. Faune des Colonies Francaises, Tome III 
 Dekkers A.M. & Liverani V. (2011 ["2010"]) Redescription of Strombus labiosus Wood, 1828 (Gastropoda: Strombidae) with description of a new species. Gloria Maris 49(5-6): 107-119. [Published 20 Jan. 2011]

External links
 

Strombidae
Gastropods described in 1828